Brachiolodes is a monotypic snout moth genus described by Hans Georg Amsel in 1953. Its single species, Brachiolodes ziczac, was described by the same author. It is found in Mauritania.

References

Phycitinae
Monotypic moth genera
Moths of Africa
Taxa named by Hans Georg Amsel
Pyralidae genera